The Hoover Gazette was a weekly newspaper that served the city of Hoover, Alabama. It was owned by Eagle Publishing Company LLC, published its first edition on June 5, 2006, and its last edition on August 15, 2007. The newspaper was published each Wednesday.

The Gazette initially started with experienced reporters, such John Cargile, former sports reporter for the Birmingham Post-Herald, and sports editor of the Alabama Journal, and Robert Carter, who was the original managing editor of the neophyte newspaper. Cargile and Carter both left the newspaper because of major philosophical differences between editorial and the owners of the newspaper.

In January 2007, Robert Martin, publisher and owner of the Montgomery Independent, became the publisher of The Hoover Gazette, replacing Barbara and Peyton Bobo, who also publish The West Alabama Gazette and The Northport Gazette. John Junkin (son of owner Clatus Junkin) was the general manager. Featured columnists included Paul Finebaum, Rheta Grimsley Johnson and Tom York. Barbara Bobo, who unsuccessfully ran for U.S. Congress, is the former five-term mayor of Millport, Alabama.

Hoover High School athletics investigation
The Gazette became a peripheral part of an investigation of alleged improper activities in the athletic department of Hoover High School. Hunter Ford, a reporter and columnist for the Gazette since its first edition, appeared on the Paul Finebaum syndicated sports talk radio program on June 19, 2007. During Ford's interview with Finebaum, Ford mentioned that rumors about Hoover High football coach Rush Propst and alleged extramarital affairs have circulated throughout Hoover and surrounding areas for some time.

After Hoover School Superintendent Andy Craig announced an investigation of the charges of misconduct within the athletic department, Ford appeared again on Finebaum's show on June 22 to address his comments from the previous show, apparently against the wishes of Gazette publisher John Junkin. Shortly after Ford's interview, Junkin called Finebaum's show and, live and on the air, said that he wanted to "talk with my writer to address his future employment." Junkin fired Ford immediately afterward.

Ford's firing provoked a firestorm on local talk radio shows, including Finebaum's show, as well as local and statewide Internet forums and blogs. On June 25, Ford appeared on Finebaum's show for the third time, the first since his firing, to address the issue further.

Ford continued to work at The Western Star, a weekly newspaper in adjoining Bessemer, then left the news business entirely the following year.

The investigation resulted in findings that largely proved Ford correct, and eventually resulted in Propst's resignation during the football season.

Demise
After the Finebaum/Ford incident, The Gazette staff slowly dwindled to a single writer. By August, with only one writer on board and the Hoover High/Propst investigation coming to a head, the Junkins published their last edition on August 15, 2007.

Carter later became a sports correspondent for The Birmingham News, then sports editor and later associate editor for The North Jefferson News in nearby Gardendale. Cargile returned to working for the Bobos at their two papers in west Alabama.

References

Hoover, Alabama
Defunct newspapers published in Alabama
Defunct weekly newspapers
Publications established in 2006
Publications disestablished in 2007
2006 establishments in Alabama
2007 disestablishments in Alabama